The New Port Richey Public Library is a public library in New Port Richey, Florida. The library is the only public library in Pasco County that is not a member of the Pasco County Library Cooperative

History
The library was founded by Elroy M. Avery as the Avery Library and Historical Society. The charters and papers of incorporation were created on December 22, 1919; the Avery Library and Historical Society formally opened within the Snell building with a collection of approximately 2,000 volumes on April 10, 1920. The Scofield Bible (a personal copy of Avery's) was the first book cataloged in the library. In 1924, Avery also published a local history text, "The Genesis of New Port Richey," to be included in the library's collection. Originally, the library charged patrons $1 a year for borrowing privileges. In the 1960s, the library was renamed to reflect the change of ownership to New Port Richey and the usage fee was dropped. 

The first Chasco Fiesta held on March 2–4, 1922, was an early source of funding and was provided by the Friends of the Library, previously The Library Associates. It was then in 1924 that the library moved to the Sims building "for increased protection from fire..." followed by a move the next year to the Morey-Bowman building. In 1963, with a new library construction being built on Main and Jefferson, the library was voted to be named the New Port Richey Public Library. Finally, in 1987 an expansion for City Hall and the library were approved with the grand opening of its current location occurring in early 1991. During this phase of expansion, the old library building at Jefferson and Main was turned into City Hall, while the library moved into the lot next door, which was previously a school. 

In May 2013, the library opened a short lived second location, dubbed the Avery branch, in the newly renovated Elfers CARES Center. NJROTC students from Gulf High School assisted in the set up. This branch is no longer in operation.

In October 2020, the library commemorated its hundred-year anniversary with a 1920s themed gala and a special edition library card with a black-and-white image of the library printed on the front of each card. Following the centennial, the library undertook a more than $2 million renovation as a part of the facility improvements included in the library's 2017–2022 Long Range Plan. This renovation was a complete remodeling of the building's interior, improving both floors of the library with the inclusion of private study rooms, programming and conference rooms, and a more open floor plan for the children's department on the second floor. Solar panels were also installed on the libraries roof during the renovation, funded by EBSCO Industries with New Port Richey Public library being one of three recipients of the company's 2019 Solar Grant. It took roughly nine months to complete the renovation, from March 2021 to January 2022, during which time the library pledged to stay open to patrons as much as possible, only ultimately closed for five days. The rededication ceremony for the library's upgraded facilities took place in June 2022, featuring the dedication of a time capsule set to be opened in 2050, and a ceremonial ribbon cutting.

Current services and programming
In addition to lending of its materials holdings, the New Port Richey Public Library offers many programs and services for the community. The library works with several local organizations and groups in the community, including the West Pasco Historical Society, which was founded in the 1970s with the support of then-director, Janet Lewis. The New Port Richey Public Library is fine free.

Adult programs and services 
Due to the Covid-19 pandemic and the library's renovation in 2021, some of the library's regular programming was put on hiatus. Former programming included several language groups, a writer's group, technology classes, and chair yoga.  Notably, the library previously hosted a weekly French language conversation group during which French speakers would gather for casual conversation and to improve their use of the language. As of 2022, former programs were beginning to return, including Guten Tag German Language class and Qigong guided meditation, along with new programs. The library has also hosted musical events; in 2013, guitarist Ana Vidovic played at the library, and in May 2022, the library hosted musician Sofia Talvik. In addition, in 2022, New Port Richey Public library received funding from the Florida Humanities Council for two sessions of a ten week English For Families course. In 2022, New Port Richey Public Library was also a participant in the Career Online High School program administered by the State of Florida. To encourage reading and library usage, the library hosts several reading challenges throughout the year for children, teens and adults.

For over eight years, the library celebrated its Reel Pride LGBT Film Series. In addition to Reel Pride, the New Port Richey Public Library has also held film festivals emphasizing human rights. In 2005, the library participated in the Human Rights Video Project, an ALA-sponsored film series made up of 13 documentaries focusing on human rights. In 2019, the library hosted Drag Queen StoryTimes.

The library has increased the variety of its holdings through the addition of an adult graphic novel collection. The library also offers a circulating art collection, called Art on the Move.

New Port Richey Public Library has hosted a variety of food related programming, including a 2019 Urban Food Sovereignty Mini Summit, and cooking classes featuring Chef Warren, who returned to the library for events in 2022 following Covid-19 and the renovation.

Tasty Tuesdays and Community Garden 
A weekly organic farmers' market, known as Tasty Tuesdays, has been held in the library courtyard since 2012. Local growers come to lay out their harvest as a part of the urban gardening movement that has spread throughout the country. The library also hosts Master Gardener events in conjunction with Tasty Tuesday, administered through the University of Florida's IFAS extension, including Earth Day events and a lecture series.

In conjunction with this effort, the library created a seed library in August 2013, through which patrons can check out seeds like they would books. This trend caught on in neighboring libraries, with Dunedin Public Library launching its own seed library within a couple of months.

Teen and children's programming 
The library has made many efforts to engage its youth patrons. In an effort to keep up with digital trends, the library celebrated International TableTop Day with board games and video games geared toward teenage patrons. The library has offered chocolate-making classes for both children and teens as well. The library formerly had a teen advisory board known as YOLO (Youth Offering Library Opinions), which participated in the 2013 Cotee River Cleanup. The teens continued their work during the Cotee River Clean Up by beautifying the Gene Sarazen Overlook Tower as a community works project. In addition to community service projects, YOLO members volunteered to help out at library events like Pi Day.

The library offers weekly story times and children's yoga classes, as well as various other programs and events, including an annual reptile show, a visit from the SPCA Suncoast animal shelter, and other education and entertaining presenters. In addition, the library has a permanent StoryWalk at the James E. Grey Preserve for children and families to explore a book in the outdoors; the book and its accompanying activities that the StoryWalk centers on is changed quarterly.

The library also takes part in the annual Reading with the Rays summer reading program.

Awards
New Port Richey Public Library is one of the founding members of the Florida Library Association. In 2006, the library was honored as the first recipient of the FLA's "Library of the Year" award. The library was is also one of the original members of the Tampa Bay Library Consortium, which it is still participates in to build connections between and with other area libraries.

Library Journal gave the New Port Richey Public Library a rating of 4 out of 5 stars in 2013. It was the only library in the state to earn a rating from Library Journal that year. In 2016, it made the Library Journal Index again with a 5-star rating, the highest-ranked in the state and one of only three Florida libraries to make the list.

In 2014, the Florida Library Association awarded library director Susan Dillinger with the Librarian of the Year Award. In 2017 the Florida Library Association awarded Library Director Susan Dillinger with the Lifetime Achievement Award.  In 2012, Dillinger was appointed as the interim city manager for New Port Richey. In honor of her service in this role for almost two years, an art exhibition wall in City Hall was named the Susan Dillinger Art Gallery.

References

External links
 City of New Port Richey
 Pasco County Library Cooperative
 New Port Richey Public Library Friends of the Library

Public libraries in Florida
New Port Richey, Florida
1920 establishments in Florida
Libraries established in 1920